Alejandro Jodorowsky Prullansky Embusterosky (born 17 February 1929) is a Chilean-French avant-garde filmmaker.
Best known for his 1970s films El Topo and The Holy Mountain, Jodorowsky has been "venerated by cult cinema enthusiasts" for his work which "is filled with violently surreal images and a hybrid blend of mysticism and religious provocation".

Born to Jewish-Ukrainian parents in Chile, Jodorowsky experienced an unhappy and alienated childhood, and so immersed himself in reading and writing poetry. Dropping out of college, he became involved in theater and in particular mime, working as a clown before founding his own theater troupe, the Teatro Mimico, in 1947. Moving to Paris in the early 1950s, Jodorowsky studied traditional mime under Étienne Decroux, and put his miming skills to use in the silent film Les têtes interverties (1957), directed with Saul Gilbert and Ruth Michelly. From 1960 onwards he divided his time between Mexico City and Paris, where he co-founded Panic Movement, a surrealist performance art collective  that staged violent and shocking theatrical events. In 1966 he created his first comic strip, Anibal 5, and in 1967 he directed his first feature film, the surrealist Fando y Lis, which caused a huge scandal in Mexico, eventually being banned.

His next film, the acid western El Topo (1970), became a hit on the midnight movie circuit in the United States, considered as the first-ever midnight cult film, and garnered high praise from John Lennon, who convinced former Beatles manager Allen Klein to provide Jodorowsky with $1 million to finance his next film. The result was The Holy Mountain (1973), a surrealist exploration of western esotericism. Disagreements with Klein, however, led to both The Holy Mountain and El Topo failing to gain widespread distribution, although both became classics on the underground film circuit. After a cancelled attempt at filming Frank Herbert's 1965 science fiction novel Dune, Jodorowsky produced five more films: the family film Tusk (1980); the surrealist horror Santa Sangre (1989); the failed blockbuster The Rainbow Thief (1990); and the first two films in a planned five-film autobiographical series The Dance of Reality (2013) and Endless Poetry (2016).

Jodorowsky is also a comic book writer, most notably the science fiction series The Incal throughout the 1980s, which has been described as having a claim to be "the best comic book" ever written. Other comic books he has written include The Technopriests and Metabarons. Jodorowsky has also extensively written and lectured about his own spiritual system, which he calls "psychomagic" and "psychoshamanism", which borrows from alchemy, the tarot, Zen Buddhism and shamanism. His son Cristóbal has followed his teachings on psychoshamanism; this work is captured in the feature documentary Quantum Men, directed by Carlos Serrano Azcona.

Early life and education
Jodorowsky was born in 1929 in the coastal town of Tocopilla, Chile, to parents who were Jewish immigrants from Yekaterinoslav (now Dnipro), Elisavetgrad (now Kropyvnytskyi) and other cities of the Russian Empire (now Ukraine). His father, Jaime Jodorowsky Groismann, was a merchant, who was largely abusive to his wife Sara Felicidad Prullansky Arcavi, and at one time accused her of flirting with a customer. Angered, he subsequently beat and raped her, getting her pregnant, which led to the birth of Alejandro. Because of this brutal conception, Sara both hated her husband and disliked her son, telling him that "I cannot love you" and rarely showing him tenderness. Alejandro also had an elder sister, Raquel Jodorowsky, but disliked her, for he believed that she was selfish, doing "everything to expel me from the family so that she could be the centre of attention." Alongside his dislike for his family, he also held contempt for many of the local people, who viewed him as an outsider because of his status as the son of immigrants, and also for the American mining industrialists who worked locally and treated the Chilean people badly. It was this treatment at the hands of Americans that led to his later condemnation of American imperialism and neo-colonialism in Latin America in several of his films. Nonetheless, he liked his local area, and was greatly unhappy when he was forced to leave it at the age of nine years old, something for which he blamed his father. His family subsequently moved to the city of Santiago, Chile.

He immersed himself in reading, and also began writing poetry, having his first poem published when he was sixteen years old, alongside associating with such Chilean poets as Nicanor Parra, Stella Díaz Varín and Enrique Lihn. Becoming interested in the political ideology of anarchism, he began attending college, studying psychology and philosophy, but stayed for only two years. After dropping out, and having an interest in theatre and particularly mime, he took up employment as a clown in a circus and began a career as a theatre director. Meanwhile, in 1947 he founded his own theatrical troupe, the Teatro Mimico, which by 1952 had fifty members, and the following year he wrote his first play, El Minotaura (The Minotaur). Nonetheless, Jodorowsky felt that there was little for him left in Chile, and so that year he moved to Paris.

It was while in Paris that Jodorowsky began studying mime with Étienne Decroux and joined the troupe of one of Decroux's students, Marcel Marceau. It was with Marceau's troupe that he went on a world tour, and wrote several routines for the group, including "The Cage" and "The Mask Maker". After this, he returned to theatre directing, working on the music hall comeback of Maurice Chevalier in Paris. In 1957, Jodorowsky turned his hand to filmmaking, creating Les têtes interverties (The Severed Heads), a 20-minute adaptation of Thomas Mann's novella. It consisted almost entirely of mime, and told the surreal story of a head-swapping merchant who helps a young man find courtship success. Jodorowsky played the lead role. The director Jean Cocteau admired the film, and wrote an introduction for it. It was considered lost until a print of the film was discovered in 2006.

In 1960, Jodorowsky moved to Mexico, where he settled down in Mexico City. Nonetheless, he continued to return occasionally to France, on one occasion visiting the Surrealist artist André Breton, but he was disillusioned in that he felt Breton had become somewhat conservative in his old age. Continuing his interest in surrealism, in 1962 he founded the Panic Movement along with Fernando Arrabal and Roland Topor. The movement aimed to go beyond the conventional surrealist ideas by embracing absurdism. Its members refused to take themselves seriously, while laughing at those critics who did. In 1966 he produced his first comic strip, Anibal 5, which was related to the Panic Movement. The following year he created a new feature film, Fando y Lis, loosely based on a play written by Fernando Arrabal, who was working with Jodorowsky on performance art at the time. Fando y Lis premiered at the 1968 Acapulco Film Festival, where it instigated a riot amongst those objecting to the film's content, and subsequently it was banned in Mexico.

It was in Mexico City that he encountered Ejo Takata (1928–1997), a Zen Buddhist monk who had studied at the Horyuji and Shofukuji monasteries in Japan before traveling to Mexico via the United States in 1967 to spread Zen. Jodorowsky became a disciple of Takata and offered his own house to be turned into a zendo. Subsequently, Takata attracted other disciples around him, who spent their time in meditation and the study of koans. Eventually, Takata instructed Jodorowsky that he had to learn more about his feminine side, and so he went and befriended the English surrealist Leonora Carrington, who had recently moved to Mexico.

Career

El Topo and The Holy Mountain (1970–1974)
In 1970, Jodorowsky released the film El Topo, which sometimes is known in English as The Mole, which he had both directed and starred in. An acid western, El Topo tells the story of a wandering Mexican bandit and gunslinger, El Topo (played by Jodorowsky), who is on a search for spiritual enlightenment, taking his young son along with him. Along the way, he violently confronts a number of other individuals, before finally being killed and being resurrected to live within a community of deformed people who are trapped inside a mountain cave. Describing the work, he stated that "I ask of film what most North Americans ask of psychedelic drugs. The difference being that when one creates a psychedelic film, he need not create a film that shows the visions of a person who has taken a pill; rather, he needs to manufacture the pill." Knowing how Fando y Lis had caused such a scandal in Mexico, Jodorowsky decided not to release El Topo there, instead focusing on its release in other countries across the world, including Mexico's northern neighbour, the United States. It was in New York City where the film would play as a "midnight movie" for several months at Ben Barenholtz's Elgin Theater. It attracted the attention of rock musician and countercultural figure John Lennon, who thought very highly of it, and convinced the president of The Beatles' company Apple Corps, Allen Klein, to distribute it in the United States.

Klein agreed to give Jodorowsky $1 million to go toward creating his next film. The result was The Holy Mountain, released in 1973. It has been suggested that The Holy Mountain may have been inspired by René Daumal's Surrealist novel Mount Analogue. The Holy Mountain was another complex, multi-part story that featured a man credited as "The Thief" and equated with Jesus Christ, a mystical alchemist played by Jodorowsky, seven powerful business people representing seven of the planets (Venus and the six planets from Mars to Pluto), a religious training regimen of spiritual rebirth, and a quest to the top of a holy mountain for the secret of immortality. During the completion of The Holy Mountain, Jodorowsky received spiritual training from Oscar Ichazo of the Arica School, who encouraged him to take LSD and guided him through the subsequent psychedelic experience. Around the same time (2 November 1973), Jodorowsky participated in an isolation tank experiment conducted by John Lilly.

Shortly thereafter, Allen Klein demanded that Jodorowsky create a film adaptation of Pauline Réage's classic novel of female masochism, Story of O. Klein had promised this adaptation to various investors. Jodorowsky, who had discovered feminism during the filming of The Holy Mountain, refused to make the film, going so far as to leave the country to escape directing duties. In retaliation, Allen Klein made El Topo and The Holy Mountain, to which he held the rights, completely unavailable to the public for more than 30 years. Jodorowsky frequently decried Klein's actions in interviews.

Soon after the release of The Holy Mountain, Jodorowsky gave a talk at the Teatro Julio Castillo, University of Mexico on the subject of koans (despite the fact that he initially had been booked on the condition that his talk would be about cinematography), at which Ejo Takata appeared. After the talk, Takata gave Jodorowsky his kyosaku, believing that his former student had mastered the art of understanding koans.

Dune and Tusk (1975–1980)
In December 1974, a French consortium led by Jean-Paul Gibon purchased the film rights to Frank Herbert's epic 1965 science fiction novel Dune and asked Jodorowsky to direct a film version. Jodorowsky planned to cast the Surrealist artist Salvador Dalí, in what would have been his only speaking role as a film actor, in the role of Emperor Shaddam IV. Dalí agreed when Jodorowsky offered to pay him a fee of $100,000 per hour. He also planned to cast Orson Welles as Baron Vladimir Harkonnen; Welles only agreed when Jodorowsky offered to get his favourite gourmet chef to prepare his meals for him throughout the filming. The book's protagonist, Paul Atreides, was to be played by Jodorowsky's son, Brontis Jodorowsky, 12 years old at the start of pre-production. The music would be composed by Pink Floyd and Magma. Jodorowsky set up a pre-production unit in Paris consisting of Chris Foss, a British artist who designed covers for science fiction publications, Jean Giraud (Mœbius), a French illustrator who created and also wrote and drew for Métal Hurlant magazine, and H. R. Giger. Frank Herbert travelled to Europe in 1976 to find that $2 million of the $9.5 million budget had already been spent in pre-production, and that Jodorowsky's script would result in a 14-hour movie ("It was the size of a phonebook", Herbert later recalled). Jodorowsky took creative liberties with the source material, but Herbert said that he and Jodorowsky had an amicable relationship. The production for the film collapsed when no film studio could be found willing to fund the movie to Jodorowsky's terms. The aborted production was chronicled in the documentary Jodorowsky's Dune, directed  by Frank Pavich. Subsequently, the rights for filming were sold to Dino De Laurentiis, who employed the American filmmaker David Lynch to direct, creating the film Dune in 1984. The documentary does not include any original film footage of what was to be Jodorowsky's Dune but does make extraordinary claims as to the influence this unmade film had on other actual science fiction films, such as Star Wars, Alien, The Terminator, Flash Gordon and Raiders of the Lost Ark.

After the collapse of the Dune project, Jodorowsky completely changed course and, in 1980, premiered his children's fable Tusk, shot in India. Taken from Reginald Campbell's novel Poo Lorn of the Elephants, the film explores the soul-mate relationship between a young British woman living in India and a highly prized elephant. The film exhibited little of the director's outlandish visual style and was never given wide release.

Later, in January 2023, Frank Pavich, director of the documentary film Jodorowsky's Dune, published an essay in The New York Times related to Jodorowsky's Dune (and more) that involved artwork generated by artificial intelligence (A.I.) programming.

Santa Sangre and The Rainbow Thief (1981–1990)
In 1982, Jodorowsky divorced his wife.

In 1989, Jodorowsky completed the Mexican-Italian production Santa Sangre (Holy Blood). The film received limited theatrical distribution, putting Jodorowsky back on the cultural map despite its mixed critical reviews. Santa Sangre was a surrealistic slasher film with a plot like a mix of Alfred Hitchcock's Psycho with Robert Wiene's The Hands of Orlac. It featured a protagonist who, as a child, saw his mother lose both her arms, and as an adult let his own arms act as hers, and so was forced to commit murders at her whim. Several of Jodorowsky's sons were recruited as actors.

He followed in 1990 with a very different film, The Rainbow Thief. Though it gave Jodorowsky a chance to work with the "movie stars" Peter O'Toole and Omar Sharif, the executive producer, Alexander Salkind, effectively curtailed most of Jodorowsky's artistic inclinations, threatening to fire him on the spot if anything in the script was changed (Salkind's wife, Berta Domínguez D., wrote the screenplay).

That same year (1990), Jodorowsky and his family returned to France to live.

In 1995, Alejandro's son, Teo, died in an accident while his father was busy preparing for a trip to Mexico City to promote his new book. Upon arriving in Mexico City, he gave a lecture at the Julio Castillo Theatre where he once again met Ejo Takata, who at this time had moved into a poor suburb of the city where he had continued to teach meditation and Zen. Takata would die two years later, and Jodorowsky would never get to see his old friend again.

Attempts to return to filmmaking (1990–2011)

In 2000, Jodorowsky won the Jack Smith Lifetime Achievement Award from the Chicago Underground Film Festival (CUFF). Jodorowsky attended the festival and his films were shown, including El Topo and The Holy Mountain, which at the time had grey legal status. According to festival director Bryan Wendorf, it was an open question of whether CUFF would be allowed to show both films, or whether the police would show up and shut the festival down.

Until 2007, Fando y Lis and Santa Sangre were the only Jodorowsky works available on DVD. Neither El Topo nor The Holy Mountain were available on videocassette or DVD in the United States or the United Kingdom, due to ownership disputes with distributor Allen Klein. After settlement of the dispute in 2004, however, plans to re-release Jodorowsky's films were announced by ABKCO Films. On 19 January 2007, it was announced online that Anchor Bay would release a box set including El Topo, The Holy Mountain, and Fando y Lis on 1 May 2007. A limited edition of the set includes both the El Topo and The Holy Mountain soundtracks. And, in early February 2007, Tartan Video announced its 14 May 2007, release date for the UK PAL DVD editions of El Topo, The Holy Mountain, and the six-disc box set which, alongside the aforementioned feature films, includes the two soundtrack CDs, as well as separate DVD editions of Jodorowsky's 1968 debut feature Fando y Lis (with his 1957 short La cravate a.k.a. Les têtes interverties, included as an extra) and the 1994 feature-length documentary La constellation Jodorowsky. Notably, Fando y Lis and La cravate were digitally restored extensively and remastered in London during late 2006, thus providing a suitable complement to the quality restoration work undertaken on El Topo and The Holy Mountain in the States by ABKCO, and ensuring that the presentation of Fando y Lis is a significant improvement over the 2001 Fantoma DVD edition. Prior to the availability of these legitimate releases, only inferior quality, optically censored, bootleg copies of both El Topo and The Holy Mountain have been circulated on the Internet and on DVD.

In the 1990s and early 2000s, Jodorowsky attempted to make a sequel to El Topo, called at different times The Sons of El Topo and Abel Cain, but did not find investors for the project.

In an interview with Premiere Magazine, Jodorowsky said he intended his next project to be a gangster film called King Shot. In an interview with The Guardian newspaper in November 2009, however, Jodorowsky revealed that he was unable to find the funds to make King Shot, and instead would be entering preparations on Sons of El Topo, for which he claimed to have signed a contract with "some Russian producers".

In 2010, the Museum of Arts and Design in New York City staged the first American cinema retrospective of Alejandro Jodorowsky entitled Blood into Gold: The Cinematic Alchemy of Alejandro Jodorowsky. Jodorowsky would attend the retrospective and hold a master class on art as a way of transformation. This retrospective would inspire the museum MoMA PS1 to present the exhibition Alejandro Jodorowsky: The Holy Mountain in 2011.

The Dance of Reality and Endless Poetry (2011–present)
In August 2011, Alejandro arrived in a town in Chile where he grew up, also the setting of his autobiography The Dance of Reality, to promote an autobiographical film based upon his book.

On 31 October 2011, Halloween night, the Museum of Modern Art (New York City) honored Jodorowsky by showing The Holy Mountain. He attended and spoke about his work and life. The next evening, he presented El Topo at the Walter Reade Theatre at Lincoln Center.

Alejandro has stated that after finishing The Dance of Reality he was preparing to shoot his long-gestating El Topo sequel, Abel Cain. By January 2013, Alejandro finished filming on The Dance of Reality and entered into post-production. Alejandro's son and co-star in the film, Brontis, claimed the film was to be finished by March 2013, and that the film was "very different than the other films he made". On 23 April, it was announced that the film would have its world premiere at the Film Festival in Cannes. coinciding with The Dance of Reality premiered alongside the documentary film Jodorowsky's Dune, which premiered in May 2013 at the Cannes Film Festival, creating a "Jodorowsky double bill".

In 2015, Jodorowsky began a new film entitled Endless Poetry, the sequel to his last "auto-biopic", The Dance of Reality. His Paris-based production company, Satori Films, launched two successful crowdfunding campaigns to finance the film. The Indiegogo campaign has been left open indefinitely, receiving donations from fans and movie-goers in support of the independent production. The film was shot between June and August 2015, in the streets of Matucana in Santiago, Chile, where Jodorowsky lived for a period in his life. The film portrays his young adulthood in Santiago, years during which he became a core member of the Chilean poetic avant-garde alongside artists such as Hugo Marín, Gustavo Becerra, Enrique Lihn, Stella Díaz Varín, Nicanor Parra and others. Jodorowsky's son, Adan Jodorowsky, plays him as an adult and Brontis Jodorowsky, plays as his father Jaime. Jeremias Herskovitz, from The Dance of Reality, portrays Jodorowsky as a teenager. Pamela Flores plays as Sara (his mother) and Stella Díaz Varín (poetess and young Jodorowsky's girlfriend). Leandro Taub portrays Jodorowsky's best friend, the poet and novelist Enrique Lihn. The film premiered in the Directors' Fortnight section of the Cannes Film Festival on 14 May 2016. Variety's review was overwhelmingly positive, calling it "...the most accessible movie he has ever made, and it may also be the best."

During an interview at the Cannes Film Festival in 2016, Jodorowsky announced his plans to finally make The Son of El Topo as soon as financial backing is obtained.

Other work
Jodorowsky is a weekly contributor of "good news" to the nightly "author news report" of his friend, Fernando Sánchez Dragó in Telemadrid.

He also released a 12" vinyl with the Original Soundtrack of Zarathustra (Discos Tizoc, Mexico, 1970).

He has cited the filmmaker Federico Fellini as his primary cinematic influence; other artistic influences included George Gurdjieff, Antonin Artaud, and Luis Buñuel. He has been described as an influence on such figures as Marilyn Manson, David Lynch, Nicolas Winding Refn, Jan Kounen, Dennis Hopper, and Kanye West.

Comics

Jodorowsky started his comic career in Mexico with the creation of Anibal 5 series in mid-1966 with illustrations by Manuel Moro. He also drew his own comic strip in the weekly series Fabulas pánicas that appeared in the Mexican newspaper, El Heraldo de México. He also wrote original stories for at least two or three other comic books in Mexico during those days: Los insoportables Borbolla was one of them. After his fourth film, Tusk, he started The Incal, with Jean Giraud (Mœbius). This graphic novel has its roots deep in the tarot and its symbols, e.g., the protagonist of The Incal, John Difool, is linked to the Fool card. The Incal (which would branch off into a prequel and sequel) forms the first in a sequence of several science fiction comic book series, all set in the same space opera Jodoverse (or "Metabarons Universe") published by Humanoids Publishing.

Comic books set in this milieu are Incal (trilogy: Before the Incal / Incal / Final Incal), Metabarons (trilogy: Castaka / The Caste of the Metabarons / Weapons of the Metabaron), and The Technopriests and also an RPG adaptation, The Metabarons Roleplaying Game. Many ideas and concepts derived from Jodorowsky's planned adaptation of Dune (which he would have been loosely based upon Frank Herbert's original novel) are featured in this universe.

Mœbius and Jodorowsky sued Luc Besson, director of The Fifth Element, claiming that the 1997 film borrowed graphic and story elements from The Incal, but they lost their case. The suit was plagued by ambiguity since Mœbius had willingly participated in the creation of the film, having been hired by Besson as a contributing artist, but had done so without gaining the approval of Incal co-creator Jodorowsky, whose services Besson did not call upon. For more than a decade, Jodorowsky pressured his publisher Les Humanoïdes Associés to sue Luc Besson for plagiarism, but the publisher refused, fearing the inevitability of the outcome. In a 2002 interview with the Danish comic book magazine Strip!, Jodorowsky stated that he considered it an honour that somebody stole his ideas.

Other comics by Jodorowsky include the Western Bouncer illustrated by Francois Boucq, Juan Solo (Son of the Gun), and Le Lama blanc (The White Lama), the latter were illustrated by Georges Bess.

Le Cœur couronné (The Crowned Heart, translated into English as The Madwoman of the Sacred Heart), a racy satire on religion set in contemporary times, won Jodorowsky and his collaborator, Jean Giraud, the 2001 Haxtur Award for Best Long Strip. He is currently working on a new graphic novel for the U.S. market.

Jodorowsky's comic book work also appears in Taboo volume 4 (ed. Stephen R. Bissette), which features an interview with the director, designs for his version of Frank Herbert's Dune, comic storyboards for El Topo, and a collaboration with Moebius with the illustrated Eyes of the Cat.

Jodorowsky collaborated with Milo Manara in Borgia (2006), a graphic novel about the history of the House of Borgia.

Psychomagic

Jodorowsky spent almost a decade reconstructing the original form of the Tarot de Marseille. From this work he moved into more therapeutic work in three areas: psychomagic, psychogenealogy and initiatic massage. Psychomagic aims to heal psychological wounds suffered in life. This therapy is based on the belief that the performance of certain acts can directly act upon the unconscious mind, releasing it from a series of traumas, some of which practitioners of the therapy believe are passed down from generation to generation. Psychogenealogy includes the studying of the patient's personality and family tree in order to best address their specific sources. It is similar, in its phenomenological approach to genealogy, to the Constellations pioneered by Bert Hellinger.

Jodorowsky has several books on his therapeutic methods, including Psicomagia: La trampa sagrada (Psychomagic: The Sacred Trap) and his autobiography, La danza de la realidad (The Dance of Reality), which he was filming as a feature-length film in March 2012. To date he has published more than 23 novels and philosophical treatises, along with dozens of articles and interviews. His books are widely read in Spanish and French, but are for the most part unknown to English-speaking audiences.

For a quarter of a century, Jodorowsky held classes and lectures for free, in cafés and universities all over the city of Paris. Typically, such courses or talks would begin on Wednesday evenings as tarot divination lessons, and would culminate in an hour long conference, also free, where at times hundreds of attendees would be treated to live demonstrations of a psychological "arbre généalogique" ("tree of genealogy") involving volunteers from the audience. In these conferences, Jodorowsky would pave the way to building a strong base of students of his philosophy, which deals with understanding the unconscious as the "over-self", composed of many generations of family relatives, living or deceased, acting on the psyche, well into adult lives, and causing compulsions. Of all his work, Jodorowsky considers these activities to be the most important of his life. Though such activities only take place in the insular world of Parisian cafés, he has devoted thousands of hours of his life to teaching and helping people "become more conscious," as he puts it.

Since 2011 these talks have dwindled to once a month and take place at the Librairie Les Cent Ciels in Paris.

His film Psychomagic, a Healing Art premiered in Lyon on 3 September 2019. It was then released on streaming services on 1 August 2020.

Influences and impact

He has cited the filmmaker Federico Fellini as his primary cinematic influence; other artistic influences included Jean-Luc Godard, Sergio Leone, Erich von Stroheim, Buster Keaton, George Gurdjieff, Antonin Artaud, and Luis Buñuel. He has been described as an influence on such figures as Marilyn Manson, David Lynch, Darren Aronofsky, Taika Waititi, Guillermo del Toro, Nicolas Winding Refn, Jan Kounen, Dennis Hopper, Eric Andre, and Kanye West.

Personal life
Jodorowsky's first wife was the actress Valérie Trumblay. He is currently married to the artist and costume designer Pascale Montandon.

He has five children: Brontis Jodorowsky, an actor who worked with his father in El Topo, The Dance of Reality and Endless Poetry; Teo, who played in Santa Sangre; Cristóbal, a psychoshaman and an actor (interpreter in Santa Sangre and the main character in the shamanic documentary Quantum Men); Eugenia Jodorowsky; and the youngest, Adan Jodorowsky, a musician known by his stage name of Adanowsky. The fashion model Alma Jodorowsky is the granddaughter of Alejandro.

Two of his children are deceased: Teo in 1995 (due to overdose, aged 24) and Cristóbal in 2022, aged 57.

On his religious views, Jodorowsky has called himself an "atheist mystic".

He does not drink or smoke, and has stated that he does not eat red meat or poultry because he "does not like corpses", basing his diet on vegetables, fruits, grains and occasionally marine products.

In 2005, Jodorowsky officiated at the wedding of Marilyn Manson and Dita Von Teese.

Fans included musicians Peter Gabriel, Cedric Bixler-Zavala and Omar Rodríguez-López of The Mars Volta, Brann Dailor of Mastodon, Luke Steele and Nick Littlemore (of the pop-duo Empire of the Sun). Wes Borland, guitarist of Limp Bizkit, said that the film Holy Mountain was a big influence on him, especially as a visual artist, and that the concept album Lotus Island of his band Black Light Burns was a tribute to it.

Jodorowsky was interviewed by Daniel Pinchbeck for the Franco-German television show Durch die Nacht mit … on the TV station Arte, in a very personal discussion, spending a night together in France, continuing the interview in different locations such as a park and a hotel.

Danish director Nicolas Winding Refn thanks Alejandro Jodorowsky in the ending titles of his 2011 film Drive, and dedicated his 2013 Thai crime thriller, Only God Forgives, to Jodorowsky. Jodorowsky also appeared in the documentary My Life Directed by Nicolas Winding Refn, directed by Refn's wife Liv, giving the couple a tarot reading.

Argentinean actor Leandro Taub thanks Alejandro Jodorowsky in his book La Mente Oculta, for which Jodorowsky wrote the prologue.

Criticism and controversy
When Jodorowsky's first feature film, Fando y Lis, premiered at the 1968 Acapulco Film Festival, the screening was controversial and erupted into a riot, due to its graphic content. Jodorowsky had to leave the theatre by sneaking outside to a waiting limousine, and when the crowd outside the theatre recognized him, the car was pelted with rocks. The following week, the film opened to sell-out crowds in Mexico City, but more fights broke out, and the film was banned by the Mexican government. Jodorowsky himself was nearly deported and the controversy provided a great deal of fodder for the Mexican newspapers.

In regard to the making of El Topo, Jodorowsky allegedly stated in the early 1970s:

In the documentary Jodorowsky's Dune, Jodorowsky states:

As a result of these alleged statements, Jodorowsky has been criticised. Matt Brown of Screen Anarchy wrote that "it's easier to wall off a certain type of criminality behind the buffer of time—sure, Alejandro Jodorowsky is on the record in his book on the making of the film as having raped Mara Lorenzo while making El Topo—though he later denied it—but nowadays he's just that hilarious old kook from Jodorowsky's Dune!" Emmet Asher-Perrin of Tor.com called Jodorowsky "an artist who condones rape as a means to an end for the purpose of creating art. A man who seems to believe that rape is something that women 'need' if they can't accept male sexual power on their own". Jude Doyle of Elle wrote that Jodorowsky "has been teasing the idea of an unsimulated rape scene in his cult classic film El Topo for decades ... though he's elsewhere described the unsimulated sex in that scene as consensual", and went on to state that the quote "has not endangered his status as an avant-garde icon".

On 26 June 2017, Jodorowsky released a statement on his Facebook account in response to the question: "Did you rape an actress during the filming of El Topo?" The following excerpts are from said statement:

Filmography 

Acting roles

Documentary appearances
 Jonathan Ross Presents for One Week Only (1991) 
 The Jodorowsky Constellation (1994)
 NWR (2012)
 Jodorowsky's Dune (2013)
 My Life Directed by Nicolas Winding Refn (2015)
 Psychomagic, a Healing Art (2019)

Bibliography
Selected bibliography of comics, novels and non-fiction writings:

Graphic novels and comics 
 The Panic Fables (1967–1970), comic strip published in El Heraldo de México.
 The Eyes of the Cat (1978)
 The Jealous God (1984)
 The Magical Twins (1987)
 Anibal 5 (1990)
 Diosamente (1992)
 Moonface (1992)
 Angel Claws (1994)
 Son of the Gun (1995)
 Madwoman of the Sacred Heart (1998)
 The Shadow's Treasure (1999)
 Bouncer (2001)
 The White Lama (2004)
 Borgia (2004)
 Screaming Planet (2006)
 Royal Blood (2010)
 Showman Killer (2010)
 Pietrolino (2013)
 The Son of El Topo (2016), incomplete series.
 Knights of Heliopolis (2017)

Jodoverse 
Beginning with The Incal in 1981, Jodorowsky has co-written and produced a series of linked comics series and graphic novels for the French-language market known colloquially as the Jodoverse. The series was initially developed with Jean Giraud using concepts and designs created for Jodorowky's unfinished Dune project.
 The Incal (1981–1988)
 Before the Incal (1988–1995)
 The Metabarons (1992–2003)
 The Technopriests (1998–2006)
 Megalex (1999–2008)
 After the Incal (2000), incomplete series.
 Metabarons Genesis: Castaka (2007–2013)
 Weapons of the Metabaron (2008)
 Final Incal (2008–2014), revised version of the After the Incal series with new art and text.
 The Metabaron (2015–2018)

Fiction
Jodorowsky's Spanish-language novels translated into English include:
 Where the Bird Sings Best (1992)
 Albina and the Dog Men (1999)
 The Son of Black Thursday (1999)

Non-fiction
 Psychomagic (1995)
 The Dance of Reality (2001)
 The Way of Tarot (2004), with Marianne Costa
 The Spiritual Journey (2005)
 The Manual of Psychomagic (2009)
 Metageneaology (2012), with Marianne Costa
 pascALEjandro: Alchemical Androgynous (2017), with Pascale Montandon

References

Sources

Further reading
 Cobb, Ben (2007). Anarchy and Alchemy: The Films of Alejandro Jodorowsky (Persistence of Vision 6), ed. Louise Brealey, pref. Alan Jones, int. Stephen Barber. London, April 2007 / New York, August 2007, Creation Books.
 Coillard, Jean-Paul (2009), De la cage au grand écran. Entretiens avec Alejandro Jodorowsky, Paris. K-Inite Editions.
 Chignoli, Andrea (2009), Zoom back, Camera! El cine de Alejandro Jodorowsky, Santiago de Chile, Uqbar Editores.
 Dominguez Aragones, Edmundo (1980). Tres extraordinarios: Luis Spota, Alejandro Jodorowsky, Emilio "Indio" Fernández; Mexicali, Mexico DF, Juan Pablos Editor. P. 109–146.
 Gonzalez, Házael (2011), Alejandro Jodorowsky: Danzando con la realidad, Palma de Mallorca, Dolmen Editorial.
 Larouche, Michel (1985). Alexandre Jodorowsky, cinéaste panique, París, ça cinéma, Albatros.
 Moldes, Diego, (2012). Alejandro Jodorowsky, Madrid, Col. Signo e Imagen / Cineastas, Ediciones Cátedra. Prologue by Alejandro Jodorowsky. 
 Monteleone, Massimo (1993). La Talpa e la Fenice. Il cinema di Alejandro Jodorowsky, Bologna, Granata Press.

External links 

 
 
 Jodorowsky publications in Métal Hurlant. BDoubliées 
 Jodorowsky albums. Bedetheque 
 Jodorowsky publications in English. Europeancomics.net

 
1929 births
Living people
20th-century alchemists
20th-century atheists
21st-century alchemists
21st-century atheists
Chilean comics writers
Chilean emigrants to France
Chilean expatriates in Mexico
Chilean film directors
Chilean experimental filmmakers
Esotericists
French-language film directors
French comics writers
French film directors
Chilean mimes
Chilean surrealist artists
Chilean surrealist writers
French surrealist artists
French surrealist writers
Surrealist filmmakers
Horror film directors
Anarchist writers
Chilean speculative fiction writers
Chilean autobiographers
Chilean Ashkenazi Jews
Chilean people of Ukrainian-Jewish descent
Jewish anarchists
Jewish atheists
Jewish feminists
Jewish mimes
20th-century mystics
Naturalized citizens of France
Chilean occultists
People from Tocopilla
Chilean performance artists
Psychedelic drug advocates
Psychotherapists
Tarot readers
Chilean anarchists
French anarchists